Andrew J. Lewis is a writer, musician, artist and co-founder of the .

Biography
In 2001 Lewis created the 'Top Notch Tosh' small press comic.  He wrote a range of short, punchy sci-fi/horror strips, illustrating many himself and collaborating with other artists including Justin Askham and Darren Chandler.  The comic ran for 6 issues.  Regular characters included space loonies Baldy and Maud, intergalactic conman Jez Scullar, and righting other people's wrongs- Obadiah LaGraisse.  Jez Scullar featured in a spin-off comic of his own, 'Caliburn' illustrated by Justin Askham, which has so far only seen its first issue completed.  Other spin-offs were 'The Man who Saved the World' a cynical 4-parter printed under the Dry Ice Factory banner, and 'Brain Fungus' a collection of strips, single-frame gags and assorted nonsense.

Lewis was the creator of Zarjaz, editing its first four issues during which time it won the National Comics Award for Best Independent Comic.  He wrote and lettered several strips, interviewed Alan Grant and Frazer Irving and wrote a major piece on breaking into comics writing which featured advice from a range of leading editors, writers and artists.

For UK science fiction comic 2000 AD, Andrew Lewis wrote the Future Shocks 'Goldie Locke and the Three B.E.A.R.S.' and 'Escape'.

Lewis also reviewed comics for Comics International, and from 2006 to 2007 was a daily contributor to Mike Read's morning show on Big L (Radio London International) radio station, where he was known as 'Lord Tosh' or 'Lord Top Notch of Tosh'.

Awards
In 2002 Zarjaz won the "Best Self-Published/Independent" National Comics Award at the annual Bristol Comic Festival and came second to Jack Staff in 2003.

Bibliography
Comics Lewis has written include:

Tharg's Future Shocks:
 "Goldie Locke & the Three B.E.A.R.s"  (with art by Boo Cook, in 2000 AD #1288, 2002)
 "Escape" (with pencils by Gary Crutchley and inks by Cliff Robinson, in 2000 AD #1410, 2004)

Notes

References

Andrew J. Lewis at 2000AD online

External links
Zarjaz details on Comics Village 

Living people
Year of birth missing (living people)
British comics writers